Sands of Time is a 2010 album by the Japanese rock band Nothing's Carved in Stone released on June 9, 2010. It reached No. 14 on the Japanese Oricon album charts.

Track listing

References 

2010 albums
Nothing's Carved in Stone albums